The Tunnels of Claudius are a hydraulic work made up of a long underground canal, six inclined service tunnels and thirty-two wells, which Emperor Claudius had built between 41 and 52 AD to control the variable levels of the Fucine Lake in Abruzzo, thus protecting riparian villages from floods and reclaiming the Fucine lands making them cultivable. Thanks to them, the lake waters flowed out through the belly of Mount Salviano from the Avezzano side along the almost  tunnel until they flowed into the Liri River on the opposite side of the mountain, under the old town of Capistrello. The underground canal represents the longest tunnel ever built since ancient times until the inauguration of the Fréjus Rail Tunnel occurring in 1871.

With the fall the Roman Empire, and during the Barbarian invasions, the main canal, not maintained anymore, became definitively clogged. The new hydraulic work, starting from a monumental inlet situated near the lake south of Avezzano, known as Incile del Fucino (Fucine Inlet), allowed the definitive drainage of the lake.

In 1902 the hydraulic work was included among Italian national monuments; the tunnel area represents a site of archaeological and speleological interest, provided with a park inaugurated in 1977 with the purpose of protecting and exploiting the whole work.

History

Origin of the plan 
Before the Claudian works it was Julius Caesar, pressed by Marsi, the local inhabitants, to see to the reclamation plan of the Fucine plateau, in Abruzzo. The initial purpose was to control the unstable level of the lake, which very often flooded riparian villages because of the frequent cloggings of the only natural swallow-hole situated at Petogna near Luco dei Marsi, while in summer, above all because of the receding waters, the lands surrounding the inhabited areas often became marshy causing serious sanitary problems to the population. According to Suetonius, beside the main purpose there was the ambitious aim of tracing a road connecting the Tiber with the Adriatic Sea through the Apennine Mountains Caesar was not able to provide for the work since he was killed before carrying out his plan.

Construction 
A first planning hypothesis provided the digging of a canal that would let the lake waters flow out through the low Cesolino hill flowing them into the Salto River. This easily feasible plan was discarded quickly, because the considerable amount of water, flowing first into the Velino River, then into the Nera River, and finally into the Tiber, would represent a flood threat for Rome. A second but harder plan provided instead to let the lake waters flow into the Liri River along a tunnel dug in Mount Salviano.

In 41 AD it was Emperor Claudius who resumed the ambitious plan and, thanks to a substantial public financing, entrusted a Roman enterprise with the works. The work, considered to be among the grandest hydraulic enterprises of the antiquity, was to regulate the flow of the Fucine Lake, feared by local populations due to the violence of its waters. Along its banks, about 30,000 men, among slaves and workmen, strove intent on the manual digging of the swallow-hole. Eleven years later, in 52 AD, the work was brought to an end. First collateral tunnels were constructed, connected to each other by means of numerous inclined shafts (or wells), which served to prepare the main digging,  having completed which, waters drained towards the Liri River. However, there were a lot of unexpected inconveniences and difficulties during the work construction, including several landslides occurring in the most vulnerable and sandiest sections of the belly or the mountain and in the area of the dam, that is the lock made between the Roman basins for the water storage and the mouth of the emissary near the Fucine inlet.

When the works were concluded Claudius, before the opening of the locks, celebrated the work by organizing a naumachia, a naval battle on the lake, with the presence of his wife Agrippina and the young Nero. Later on with Trajan, between 98 and 117 AD, and with Hadrian, between 117 and 138 AD, there were maintenance works, which became necessary right from the inauguration due to the configuration of the carved rock, with a great economic and even human cost. Thanks to this work the lake basin shrank by about  warding off the flood danger. The economy of Marsica and especially of the municipalities of Alba Fucens, Lucus Angitiae and Marruvium became thriving, and the surrounding mountainous areas were chosen as holiday resorts.

Neglect 
With the fall of the Roman Empire and the Barbarian invasions which also marked Marsica history, maintenance inevitably failed, so much so that, most probably also because of a serious earthquake occurring in 508 AD, canals became clogged with the consequence of the return of the Fucine Lake to the previous levels. In the subsequent centuries Frederick II of Hohenstaufen (13th century) and Ferdinand I of the Two Sicilies (1790) tried to restore the water drainage into the Roman emissary, failing in their purpose due to the scarcity of funds and the complexity of the project.

New hydraulic works 

From 1826, about 18 centuries after the first Claudian drainage, new attempts to partially recover the function of the emissary were carried out by Cavaliere Luigi Giura and Commendatore Carlo Afan de Rivera.

Afan de Rivera was given the task by King Francis I of providing for the new restoration plan of the emissary of Claudius. But it was with the intervention of Roman banker Alessandro Torlonia that on 10 July 1854 the Claudian plan was resumed with the technical assistance of Swiss engineer Franz Mayor de Montricher. The work was concluded in 1870 by two engineers, Swiss site engineer Enrico Samuele Bermont and French deputy site engineer Alessandro Brisse, assisted by agent Léon De Rotrou. In 1873 the gradual drainage of the Fucine Lake began, while the reclamation operations of the territory were brought to an end between 1875 and 1876.

Workers and technicians, among the best and most qualified of the time, were employed for decades, who restored the original emissary enlarging its section. The waters of the Fucine flowed out slowly into the Liri River from the exit of the tunnel under the old town of Capistrello. Other canals and wells were added to the old tunnels and those from the Roman age were enlarged. The purpose of the rock-carved tunnels with an inclined course was that of allowing air to arrive into the Mount Salviano tunnel and workers, means and dug materials to pass through.

On 1 October 1878 the lake was officially declared drained. Thus the Fucine plain, having been reclaimed and quickly supplied with several facilities, became a fertile land, ideal for farming productions, especially cereals, vegetables and sugar beets, the latter being processed in the Avezzano sugar mill. And so it was that Fucine fishers became farmers.

A second emissary was made built by the Torlonia in the first half of the 20th century, with the purpose of compensating for the functions of the main tunnels in case of extraordinary repairs. It starts from the intersection point of the Roman emissary with the outer drainage next to one of the water storage basins of the Incile del Fucino southwards, ending up in Canistro next to one of the hydroelectric power plants built by the Torlonia with the aim of generating power for the operation of the Avezzano paper and sugar mill.

Perspectives 
In June 1977, with the aim of protecting and exploiting the work, the Archaeological Park of Claudius was established, comprised between the entrances to the tunnels and the Fucine Inlet.

The work was inserted among the Luoghi del Cuore ("Places of the Heart") for the year 2016 by FAI.

In 2017 funds were allocated for the park exploitation by the Chamber of Commerce of L'Aquila, the municipality of Avezzano and the GAL Terre Aquilane ("Aquilan Lands").

Architecture

Emissary 
The entrance lies near the "emissary head" of the inlet at Borgo Incile south of Avezzano, next to the intersection with the outer drainage canal crossing the plateau longitudinally as far as the Bacinetto ("Little Basin"), a reservoir made built by Alessandro Torlonia to be used in case of extraordinary repairs or water needs. It is a depressed area of the plain whose elevation stands lower; it is located between the central pumping station of Borgo Ottomila (Celano) and the territories of Ortucchio, San Benedetto dei Marsi and Venere dei Marsi.

The section of the Torlonia emissary allows in certain points to observe the original one from the Roman age in both the entrance area to the Inlet and the exit that is situated on the opposite side of the mountain, under the old town of Capistrello, at Pisciacotta. In fact, in some parts it preserves the Roman age walls built in opus reticulatum. In order to simplify the drilling and extraction work of the material, 32 vertical wells and 6 inclined tunnels were also dug, of which in particular the impressive rests located on the eastern side of Mount Salviano are visible.

Fucine Inlet 
The emissary head of Borgo Incile is dominated by the large statue of the Immaculate Conception of the Blessed Virgin Mary rising above the three-arched bridge of the sluice gates. The work was constructed by architect Carlo Nicola Carnevali in 1876. The structure features two water storage basins, one with a trapezoidal shape and the other hexagonal, and three gates (or locks). The first one separates the major hexagonal basin from the forebasin through a gorge.

The tunnels 
 Major Tunnel, located on the eastern side of the mountain, features three large arches, that is the entrances which join after a short inner stretch. Deeper inside there is the oblique tunnel (the so-called bypass).
 Blacksmith Tunnel, on the eastern side of the mountain, allows to know the system of tunnels and numerous wells closely. A first stretch was paved and equipped with lighting. The bypass connects it with the major tunnel.
 Imperial Tunnel, located lower compared to the previous one, connected to it through the well no. 23.
 Coppersmith, Machine and Oil-Lamp Tunnels, on the western side of the mountain.

See also 

 Emissary (hydraulics)
 Fucine Lake
 Liri
 Marsica
 Mount Salviano
 Capistrello

References

Bibliography

External links 

 

Roman aqueducts
Roman sites of Abruzzo
Province of L'Aquila
Buildings and structures in Avezzano
Claudius
House of Torlonia
Marsica
Capistrello